Public transport in Tallinn consists of bus, tram, trolleybus, train and ferry services. Bus, tram and trolleybus routes are mainly operated by Tallinna Linnatranspordi AS. Electric train services are offered by Elron and the ferry service to Aegna island is operated by Kihnu Veeteed.

Tram, trolleybus and bus services used to be divided between Tallinna Autobussikoondis (bus services) and TTTK (tram and trolleybus lines), but these companies were merged in 2012 into Tallinna Linnatranspordi AS (TLT).

Tallinn is the only city in Estonia to have ever used trams or trolleybuses. The first tram route was opened in 1888. Trolleybuses were first planned for Tallinn in 1946, but the first route to open commenced services in 1965. Since then the trolleybus network was expanded to nine routes however operations began to be scaled back. In 2000 one route was closed followed by another in 2012 followed by two further routes closing in 2015, and another one route in 2017 leaving four lines remaining.

A light rail service in Tallinn has been planned since the 1970s. The project halted when Estonia became independent from the Soviet Union, but in the 2000s the planning resumed. The light rail would start in the city centre, usually at Vabaduse väljak (Freedom Square) or Viru keskus (Viru shopping centre) and finish in East Lasnamäe, having 10–12 stations.

All trains depart from the Balti jaam which is the main rail station of Tallinn near the Baltic Sea. Elron offers local EMU services to Keila, Paldiski and Turba (works for extension to Haapsalu is currently in progress) in the west and Aegviidu in the east, as well as DMU services to Pärnu, Viljandi, Tartu and Narva, replacing Edelaraudtee on these lines since January 2014. Trains make up the backbone of fast transportation from city centre to Nõmme, southernmost city district of Tallinn

Tallinn's Public Transportation Map with Main Routes and Timetable 
The official map of Tallinn's public transportation of 2020 can't be shared on Wikipedia because of copyright issues, but it can be seen here: https://visittallinn.ee/static/files/010/transportation_map_2020_eng.jpg.

Tallinn public transportation timetable is available in seven languages online: Estonian, English, Finnish, Russian, German, Latvian and Lithuanian. Timetable also has built in journey planner and live map view of vehicles location. Timetable in English can be seen here: https://transport.tallinn.ee/#/en.

Commuter train timetable and journey planner can be seen here: https://elron.ee/en.

Systems

Bus

Internal
The main bus terminal in Tallinn is located in Viru keskus in the city centre. 14 out of 72 Tallinn's bus routes start from Viru keskus. Other bigger end/start stations include Väike-Õismäe, Keskuse, Seli, Balti jaam, Priisle, Kadaka, Vana-Pääsküla and Kopli. There are plans to construct new public transportation terminals to Lilleküla called Kristiine HUB (between current train station and Kristiine keskus) and Ülemiste (Tallinn's new main train station, between current Ülemiste train station, T1 Mall of Tallinn and Ülemiste keskus).

Bus routes can be found almost everywhere in Tallinn even high-density districts, but especially in Pirita, Lasnamäe, Haabersti and Nõmme where they provide the backbone of the public transportation system, as these districts don't have trams or trolleybuses. Regular commuter trains do go through Nõmme district, which Elron operates, but the system is somewhat inefficient since no bus line is designed to be a "feeder line" for the commuter trains in Nõmme at the moment.

The routes and timetables are set by Tallinna Transpordiamet (Tallinn Department of Transportation). The contracts are renewed every five years. The route numbers in Tallinn consist of one or two numbers, occasionally accompanied by a letter A or B. These letters are usually used when two (or three) bus routes use mostly the same trajectory but have different end stops, for example there are bus routes 17 and 17A which both start from the same bus terminus and follow the same trajectory but have different end terminus. There has also been a special Park & Ride bus route 1PR, which was opened in September 2007 and offered service between the Pirita Park & Ride parking lot and the city centre. The route was closed from January 2009.

Nearly all routes have two terminus stops, one of which serves to drivers also as a resting stop.

Tallinn has very few "feeder lines", which take passengers to another means of transport. For example, bus route no. 57 has been shortened to a tram terminus, there used to be the bus route 25, which departed just 5 times on weekdays. It took passengers to the two trolleybus terminuses in Mustamäe, partially similarly to bus route #37, the route was closed in September 2020. There is also bus route 21A which used to takes passengers to the trolleybus terminus in Väike-Õismäe (trolleybus doesn't go to Väike-Õismäe anymore so it's feeder line for another bus route).

Routes are mostly operated between 5:20 am and 0:20 am throughout the day. Some bus routes, mainly the express routes, operate only during peak hours and have a break between 10am–11am and 2pm–3pm. From 1 September 2012, express routes have the same ticket price as regular bus routes. Express bus routes used to have letter E after number but not anymore.

From 7 November until the end of 2008 the Department of Transport carried out a pilot project, during which popular bus and trolleybus routes' operating times were prolonged until 1 am (did not continue). Also, there have been talks of night bus lines, but currently there are night bus, tram and trolleybus routes only on New Year's nights.

The scheduled intervals of buses depend on route and time of the day. Most routes to high-density districts of Lasnamäe, Väike-Õismäe, Mustamäe and Peguranna (all built during Soviet occupation) have typical intervals of 6–15 minutes, while typical scheduled bus intervals to low-density districts of Nõmme and Pirita are 12–60 minutes (some routes are operated only during rush hours and not on weekends).

Tallinn Department of Transportation bought 100 new environmentally friendly compressed gas buses Solaris Urbino 12 CNG and Solaris Urbino 18 CNG from Solaris Bus & Coach which started to launch into service from August 2020. In the coming years Tallinn has decided to buy more compressed gas buses totaling 350 and replace all older diesel buses by 2025. Only the newest Euro 6 emission standard-compliant diesel buses will remain in use alongside the gas buses. Such diesel buses are MAN Lion's City A78, MAN Lions's City GL / A40, Volvo 7900 Hybrid and Iveco Irisbus Crossway LE SFR 161/01.

Other diesel buses currently operating but that are soon deducted from Tallinn's bus fleet are Scania K 270 UB4X2LB, Scania CL94 UA6X2/2LB 300 Omnilink and Volvo B12MA.

Tallinn Department of Transportation currently owns 530 buses.

Regional

Regional bus routes are managed by the Harjumaa Ühistranspordikeskus (HÜTK) (Harju County Public Transportation Centre). The Centre was established in early 2005. The establishers were the 25 local governments of Harjumaa and the Government of the Harju County as the representative of the Republic of Estonia. The goal of the centre is to arrange public transportation in Harju County to raise quality of the service provided. The routes are drawn by HÜTK and then given to different operators. There are also about 50 commercial lines in Harju County.

Tram

The tram network is fairly short (19.7 km or 12.2 miles) and serves mainly the city centre with its surrounding areas. There are 4 tram lines and three types of trams—Tatra KT4 (bought from the German cities of Gera, Cottbus, Frankfurt, and Erfurt) and Tatra KTNF6, which basically is a Tatra KT4 with a lowered middle-section, and CAF Urbos AXL. Twenty new CAF Urbos AXL trams entered service in 2015/16. Altogether there are 70 trams in Tallinn but only about half of them are in daily use.

A line 4 extension to Tallinn Airport was opened on September 1, 2017, consisting of 2 new stops:  and Lennujaam (Airport). A tunnel was built to bypass the train tracks by Ülemiste jaam. 6 old Tatra KT4 trams were fully renovated in 2016–2017 to imitate the look of early 20th century trams. All of them operate on line 3. 12 old Tatra KT6s and 2 KT4s were fully modernized in 2017–2018.  This means that new or fully modernized trams make up about 57% of all trams in Tallinn.

International procurement for purchasing 8 new trams to Tallinn was started in late 2019 with option to buy 15 more. In 2022, the Polish company Pojazdy Szynowe PESA Bydgoszcz (PESA) won the public procurement of new trams, supplying up to 23 new trams to TLT for 50 million euros. The first new trams should be delivered in 2024. The tram model offered by PESA is PESA Twist, which is adapted to the gauge of Tallinn. The 28.6-meter-long, five-door trams can accommodate a total of 300 passengers (65 seats). In addition to PESA, two other tenderers took part in this procurement but lost to PESA: the Spanish company Construcciones y Auxiliar de Ferrocarriles (CAF) and the joint Finnish-Czech tenderers Škoda Transtech and Škoda Transportation.

The tram system is operated by TLT.

Trolleybus

Trolleybuses serve the western part of Tallinn, mainly Mustamäe district. Trolleybus service began in 1965 with a route from the Estonian National Opera "Estonia" to Hipodroom (Hippodrome). Currently there are 4 routes: 1, 3, 4 and 5 from city centre (Kaubamaja and Balti jaam) to Mustamäe. In 2000 Trolleybus line nr 8 was replaced with bus line nr 22, on 1 December 2012 trolleybus line nr 2 was replaced with bus lines 24 and 24A (24A closed by now), on 1 January 2016 trolleybus lines nr 6 and 7 were replaced with hybrid buses nr 42 and 43 and on 2 May 2017 trolleybus line nr 9 was replaced by hybrid buses (line 72).

All trolleybus lines are scheduled typically with 8-15 minute interval between two vehicles of the same line.

TLT uses Solaris Trollino 12 and Solaris Trollino 18 trolleybuses made by Solaris Bus & Coach. TLT AS operates with 50 trolleybuses.

There was also a planned route (nr 10) from Väike-Õismäe to Kopli but it never opened.

Commuter Train

The Elron commuter trains are especially meant for the Greater Tallinn Area Harju County residents for a connection to Tallinn. Routes are also used by city residents, especially of Nõmme district, the southernmost district of Tallinn. Railway lines pass through Kristiine, Nõmme and Lasnamäe districts of the city, with terminus stop Balti jaam (Baltic Station near the Baltic Sea, hence the name) being located in the Kesklinn district close to Põhja-Tallinn district. Railway transport is free for registered city residents inside the city borders (1st zone): till Vesse stop on Eastern line, Laagri stop on Western line and Männiku stop on South-Western line. Trains inside of Tallinn are scheduled typically with 10-20 minute interval at rush hour (6 am - 8:30 am and 3:30 pm – 18:30 pm) and 25 - 35 minute interval at other times. Trains are in service typically from 5:15 am to 23:45, depending on the direction and line. Nõmme district has installed bicycle parking to every railway station in the district to encourage commuter train use by its residents. Currently there are no appropriate feeder bus routes for the commuter train in Nõmme district.

Elron operates Stadler Flirt EMU and DMU trains from 2013. New Škoda 7Ev electric commuter trains are meant to start operating together with Stadler Flirts beginning from 2024. New trains are mainly meant for Tallinn - Tartu line but since Estonia's main train depot is situated in Nõmme district it is most likely that operations inside of Tallinn will be made by both companies commuter trains.

Ferry
Tallinn has one ferry connection to Aegna island, operated by Kihnu Veeteed. Since Aegna doesn't have many residents, the ferry is mostly for tourists and is operated only summertime. City residents can use the ferry for free.

Tickets

All Tallinn bus, tram and trolleybus routes belong to a unified ticket system. Harju County routes and commuter trains (Elron) have a different fare system, which depends on the distance traveled.

In a public opinion poll on 25 March 2012, over 75% of the participants answered "yes" for fare-free transit on Tallinn's public transport system. Public transport has been fare-free for Tallinn residents since 1 January 2013, making Tallinn the first European capital abolishing fares for city residents. Later, Elron and Tallinn City council reached an agreement, which makes urban routes (1st zone) free for city residents.

In spite of this, the public transport network is not completely fare-free, as fares continue to be charged to non-residents (including tourists and visitors) to the city.

Ticket Types and Public Transportation Customs

Registered residents of Tallinn who have their ID cards and validated Public Transport Card (Ühiskaart) or equivalent student ID can travel free of charge on buses, trams and trolley buses in Tallinn from 1 January 2013 and on commuter trains within city borders since October 2013. Single tickets, valid for single boarding, can be bought from vehicle drivers or with contactless bank cards from the ticket/validation machine located near the door next to driver on buses. Card payment is also available on commuter trains but ticket can be purchased from train's customer service worker with cash. Commuters who have Elron's Transport card can load money to card to purchase a ticket from ticket machine located in all train entrances. Your ticket (on Ühiskaart) must be validated when entering the vehicle.

Non-residents can use the travel card for loading cash for single tickets, different period tickets and other special tickets. Discount tickets are eligible to use for students, pensioners and disabled people. Besides residents, anyone under the age of 7 may ride for free. Estonian citizens from 65 or over also ride for free. Also passengers with children under 3 years of age can ride for free. Preparations for a more uniform ticket system throughout Harju County, including Tallinn, are already underway to make commuting more smooth.

The vehicle can generally be entered from all doors and the ticket (Ühiskaart) should be validated immediately upon entry. If you want to get out of the vehicle at the next stop, you must press the stop button well before the stop. Otherwise, the driver may pass the stop.

Fare Collection

In Tallinn, most public transport vehicles operate on a proof-of-payment system, and can be entered from any door. As of July 2008, Tallinn Municipal Police fare inspectors randomly check tickets, stopping vehicles at stops so no one can leave the vehicle unnoticed. A fine (maximum of €40) is charged to any passenger without a valid ticket. If a passenger has forgotten his/her ID-card, then he/she can tell the ticket controller his/her social security number aka ID code, which, in case the person has a valid ticket, proves the right of travelling. Since 1 January 2013, fare-free travellers (except those who could travel for before) have to validate their Public Transport Card (Ühiskaart); if they fail to do so, or if they fail to show their ID card, they can be fined €40.

Future Plans

Bus 

TLT has promised that by 2025 there would be no diesel buses operating in Tallinn public transportation, but transition to more environmentally friendly public transportation doesn't stop there. According to Tallinn Development Plan 2035 all public transportation is going to be fueled by electricity including buses by 2035. Future plans see more express bus routes and new tram lines that are fed by feeder bus routes, bicycle rental, short rental of cars and ride sharing. The goal is to get from one sub-city-centre to another in 20 minutes.

Tram 
In 2019, an interim report on the feasibility study of light rail transport in Tallinn and Harju County was completed, which suggests what tram lines could be in Tallinn and the surrounding area in the future. Study found that Põhja-Tallinn district needs new tram line badly because the biggest real estate projects inside of Tallinn city are going on there, thus more people are going to live there in the near future. Study also suggested five most important lines inside of Tallinn and four that would go outside of the city's boundaries. These lines go from city centre to Väike-Õismäe (Astangu), Mustamäe, Järve, Priisle, Maardu, Kopli, Stroomi, Viimsi, Peetri (Jüri) and Tabasalu. Study also suggested many minor changes in tram network. The main goal for this plan is to minimize further motorization of Tallinn by personal cars.

In Tallinn Development Strategy for 2035, which was published in 2020, one can see that most of the suggested lines were scrapped, but it also has more concrete plans for future tram network of Tallinn. New tram lines are going to be Ülemiste - Vanasadama (connecting Old Town Harbour with Tallinn Airport), Kesklinn - Rahu tee (goes to Northern side of Lasnamäe), Kesklinn - Pelguranna (goes to Põhja-Tallinn), Kesklinn - Peetri (goes to the Rae parish outside of Tallinn). Smaller network change is going to connect Pärnu mnt and Tartu mnt by Rävala boulevard. Development strategy doesn't mention what is the schedule for completing these lines but line to Vanasadama goes to official planning stage in 2021 and the construction should be completed in 2023. This specific line is estimated to cost €15 to €20 million.

Trolleybus 
According to Tallinn Development Plan 2035, all trolleybus routes will be abolished by 2035 and they will be replaced by electric bus routes. Currently TLT owns 50 trolleybuses that are going to continue operation until they withstand (average age of trolleybuses was 13,2 years in 2019). Different routes are most probably going to be abolished one by one not all together. The change affects Mustamäe district the most which is the only Tallinn's district that still has trolleybus routes as main backbone of public transportation.

Commuter Train 
In 2020, Tallinn announced plans to open new train lines inside of the Tallinn city territory in the next 15 years. According to plan, no new railways have to be constructed, but some railways that are currently in use only for freight are planned to also accommodate commuter trains in the near future. One of the new lines is planned to run between two rapidly developing areas of Ülemiste and Kopli. Second line would be the already in use line Balti jaam - Laagri (currently Balti jaam - Pääsküla). Three transfer stations to hop to the other line are also planned located in Kristiine (Lilleküla station), Tondi and Järve. City is planning to use trains that belong to Elron. These trains would go back and forth the city's internal lines. The main reason for this is to have more departures inside the city, so that more people would prefer commuter trains as their main transportation mean. However, in order to implement this plan, it is necessary to acquire additional trains, build transfer stations and proper railway infrastructure, especially on the prospective Ülemiste-Kopli line.

In 2019, Estonia's Ministry of Economic Affairs and Communications proposed a ring rail line to better connect the Eastern and Western parts of Tallinn. The corridor should run either under the lake Ülemiste from Rae parish (near the Lasnamäe district) to Saue parish (near the Nõmme district) or above the lake on already mostly existing railway. Studies suggested the first route. The idea is to redirect freight away from Tallinn city centre and open new commuter railway line. Planned Rail Baltic (European gauge railway) would help to materialize this plan somewhat because it could have parallel railway (13 km) with Russian gauge (used in Finland, Estonia, Latvia etc.) and local train stations on it, but it wouldn't reach to Saue parish, so that part would have to be built in addition (14 km). Ring rail line would be important for Saku, Saue and Rae parishes, which this railway would pass. All these parishes especially Rae and Saue are rapidly developing as huge low density suburban regions, although they're not part of Tallinn. This plan could help to reduce car driving in already congested Tallinn. Proposed ring rail would be 27 km long and would go from Lagedi to Saue.

The Government of Estonia announced of plans to electrify all railways (800 km) in Estonia starting from 2022 with €300 million, but Estonia's Ministry of Economic Affairs and Communications has proposed that Elron should instead buy new hydrogen trains for Tallinn - Viljandi commuter railway line as a test line. Use of hydrogen trains would be significantly cheaper and saved money could be used to make rail transportation faster. Studies of this plan are currently underway. This railroad also goes through Tallinn and has some stations in the city's boundaries.

Proposed Public Transportation Terminals 
New public transportation terminals will be built in Ülemiste and Kristiine (Lilleküla). The terminal in Lilleküla is named Kristiine HUB (between current train station and Kristiine keskus). Ülemiste terminal will be the Tallinn's new main train station, between current Ülemiste train station, T1 Mall of Tallinn and Ülemiste keskus. It will also be Tallinn's new international railway station where trains will go towards Riga (Rail Baltica), St.Petersburg and Helsinki (Tallinn-Helsinki railway tunnel aka Talsinki). According to plans, these two terminals should be the places where train, bus and tram routes connect to each other for easier and more convenient transfer between different public transportation vehicles. The construction of Ülemiste terminal should end in 2026. The Kristiine HUB should be completed before 2035.

Plan of what changes will happen with current Viru bus terminal are not revealed yet.

Bicycle Road Network 
Tallinn has promised to become more bicycle and other "light traffic" friendlier city by 2028. Tallinn Cycling Strategy 2018-2028 is an official guide of what the city should do to become a better place for cycling. It also contains the exact map of Tallinn's main cycle paths, which should all be built before 2028. There would be two types of cycling paths in Tallinn - recreational paths (in Estonian: tervisevõrk) and core network paths (in Estonian: põhivõrk). Both types of paths are connected to each other.

Most of the recreational paths would be on the outskirts of the city in suburban districts like Nõmme, Pirita and Haabersti, where they would make up a significant part of the proposed bicycle paths. Recreational paths are not reserved only for cyclists but also for other light traffic. This means that pedestrians, cyclists and riders of other smaller electric vehicles (electric scooters for example) must share this recreational path. Fortunately most of these are designed to be bilateral asphalt roads that are usually completely separated from car traffic. Most of the cycling paths that are already exist are the recreational paths.

Core network path is planned to be the main bicycle path type in the districts of Kesklinn (city centre, Lasnamäe, Kristiine, Põhja-Tallinn and Mustamäe). Creating new bicycle paths has proven to be the most difficult in the city centre where some roads are historically very narrow and other on the contrary too wide and car centric (Liivalaia, Pärnu mnt, Narva mnt, Tartu mnt etc.). City officials are not too keen on lane reduction of roads for cyclists and also pedestrians. According to the Tallinn cycling strategy, core network path type bicycle roads are meant to be separated from car and pedestrian traffic to ensure the safety of all infrastructure users. Thus, only cyclists and riders of other smaller electric vehicles (ex electric scooters) are allowed to ride on core network paths. One good example of this type of cycling path in Tallinn is Reidi tee.

The subject has brought up controversy because city residents and city officials have differing opinions. The Estonian media has also started to deal with the matter, proving how dangerous the current solutions of bicycle paths in the city centre are and how cheaply they could be solved temporary. However, the city officials have been against the solutions of activists. Instead Tallinn city officials constantly talk in the media as a positive political advertisement about how many kilometers of new "cycling paths" (in Estonian: jalgrattatee) they build each year, when in reality these are not cycle paths but rather mixed-use sidewalks (in Estonian: kergliiklustee, literally meaning light traffic road). Such sidewalks are dangerous, especially in the city centre, where many more people live and commute than in the suburbs. Some quite newly built cycling paths that should be meant for only bicycles are instead built as mixed-use sidewalks (example: Valdeku street, which was reconstructed in 2020 and should have cycle paths but instead has mixed-use sidewalk). This shows that Tallinn officials follow the urban planning outlined in the cycling strategy very loosely at present and instead of creating Tallinn's cycling network they are working to create Tallinn's mixed-use sidewalk network.

In 2020 the district governor of Kesklinn (city centre) Monika Haukanõmm made a bold statement, that in 10–15 years time cycling would be the fastest mode of transportation in the district of Kesklinn. "The heart of the city must be better reached by public transportation than today and along footpaths and bicycle paths, which should give a reason not to come to the city centre by car. To do this, we need to think about how to increase the quality of street space so that we can compete with the quality of urban space of Helsinki, Riga and also Stockholm in 10-15 years. Fewer cars and more light traffic means more light roads (mixed-use sidewalks?). The goal is for bicycles and bikes to become the fastest means of transportation in the city centre, and they also have their own space for movement," Haukanõmm said. According to Tallinn Development plan 2035, cycling should make up at least 11% of all traffic in the city in 2035. Cycling, riding with small electric vehicles and ride sharing should feed the tram, bus and commuter train lines, thus it should be seen as part of the public transportation system.

References

External links

 Tallinn public transport schedules
 TLT official site
 Tallinn Department of Transport official site
 Map of Tallinn, pick Ühistransport for public transport info
 eng.yhistransport.eu, an unofficial site dedicated to public transportation in Tallinn (in English)
 Tallinn trams (in English)

Transport in Tallinn
Public transport in Estonia